Hedinia is a monotypic genus of flowering plants belonging to the family Brassicaceae. It only contains one known species, Hedinia tibetica.

Description
They are ciliate (with a fringe of marginal hairs).
The cauline leaves (on an aerial stems) are similar to the basal leaves, are reduced in size with divisions toward stem apex. The racemes (flower spikes) are bracteate throughout or rarely only basally. The distal (furthest) bracts are subsessile (having a very small stalk), sometimes adnate (grown from or closely fused) to the pedicel (stalk of a flower). The fruit (or seed capsule) is broadly oblong, rarely oblong-linear or suborbicular in shape. They are flat or slightly twisted, obtuse, slightly retuse (blunt ended), or rarely subacute at both ends. The valves are glabrous (hairless) or pubescent. The style is 0.3-0.8 mm. The seeds are light to dark brown in colour, oblong shaped, 0.8-1.1 long and 0.4-0.6 mm wide. They bloom between June and August, and fruiting between July-September.

Taxonomy
The genus name of Hedinia is in honour of Sven Hedin (1865–1952), a Swedish geographer, topographer, explorer, photographer, travel writer and illustrator. The Latin specific epithet of tibetica refers to Tibet, where the original plants were found.

It was first described and published in S.Hedin (edited), Southern Tibet (S. Tibet) Vol.6 Issue 3 on page 77 in 1922.

Range and habitat
Its native range is from Central Asia to China and the Himalayas. It is found in the regions of China (in Qinghai and Xinjiang), East and West Himalayas, Kyrgyzstan, Nepal, Tadzhikistan and Tibet.

It grows in sandstone gravel, on alpine meadows, steppe, scree and sandy slopes. Including on the semi-shrub deserts of the upper slopes of the Qinghai-Xizang Plateau, and the Tibetan Plateau.

References

Other sources
 Sven Anders Hedin, Southern Tibet; Discoveries in Former Times Compared with My Own Researches in 1906-1908, Volume 6, Part 3

Brassicaceae
Plants described in 1922
Flora of Central Asia